This is a list of public holidays in Sint Maarten.

References

Lists of public holidays by country